Anti H-Block was the political label used in 1981 by supporters of the Irish republican hunger strike who were standing for election in both Northern Ireland and the Republic of Ireland. "H-Block" was a metonym for the Maze Prison, within whose H-shaped blocks the hunger strike was taking place.

Bobby Sands, the first of these hunger strikers, was nominated in the Westminster April 1981 by-election in Fermanagh and South Tyrone. After his victory and death, the Representation of the People Act was passed to prevent convicted prisoners serving sentences of more than one year from standing for Parliament in the United Kingdom, so Owen Carron, Sands' agent, stood as an "Anti-H-Block Proxy Political Prisoner" and won the seat in the subsequent by-election in August.

In the Republic of Ireland's general election in June 1981 twelve candidates ran under the Anti H-Block banner, nine of whom were prisoners. Kieran Doherty and Paddy Agnew won seats in Cavan–Monaghan and Louth respectively, while both Joe McDonnell and Martin Hurson narrowly missed election in Sligo–Leitrim and Longford–Westmeath . Eamonn Sweeney noted that: 

The successes of the Anti H-Block movement galvanised the Irish republican movement, and led to the entry the following year into mainstream electoral politics of Sinn Féin.

Candidates in the 1981 Irish general election 
Nine candidates were officially endorsed by the Anti H-Block committee, eight of which were imprisoned at the time.

Candidates:

 Denotes candidates elected to Dáil Éireann

References

Literature
 Sweeney, Eamonn, Down down deeper and down : Ireland in the 70s and 80s; Dublin : Gill & Macmillan, 2010.
 End of Hungerstrike Statement (by the prisoners), at the Internet Archive

Footnotes

1981 disestablishments in Ireland
1981 establishments in Ireland
1981 in Ireland
1981 in Northern Ireland
Irish republicanism
Sinn Féin
The Troubles (Northern Ireland)